Dos de mayo, la libertad de una nación or 2 de mayo, la libertad de una nación is a Spanish period drama television series produced by BocaBoca for Telemadrid. Its two seasons aired in 2008.

Premise 
The fiction starts with the burial of Manuela Malasaña, and then focus on the daily-life hardships of the Madrilenian people endured under French occupation during the Peninsular War.

Cast 
 Celia Freijeiro as Pepita García.
 .
 .
 .
 William Miller.
 Quim Vila.
 Celine Tyll.
 .
 Miguel Rellán.
 Diego Molero.
 Andreas Muñoz.
 Nando González.
 .
 Ramón Esquinas.
 .
 Luis Felpeto.

Production and release 
The series was produced by BocaBoca for Telemadrid. and directed by María Cereceda and Gonzalo Baz.

Underpinning an exaltation of the Spanish nation, and forming part of a wider audiovisual effort by the regional branch of the People's Party (PP) in the Community of Madrid on the occasion of the 200th anniversary of the Dos de Mayo Uprising, the series may be interpreted as "in line with the political ideology of the People's Party and with its attitude towards the particularist discourses of Basque or Catalan peripheral nationalisms", in the view of José Carlos Rueda Laffond, and as an imprint of an "epic and patriotic ideal of a single national organic community" reflecting on the conservative ideology characteristic of the PP in the Madrid region.

The first season, consisting of 13 episodes, premiered on 28 April 2008. The broadcasting run of the 9-episode second season ended on 17 November 2008. The series re-aired on other regional broadcasters such as Canal Sur Televisión and Aragón Televisión.

References 
Citations

Bibliography
 
 
 

2008 Spanish television series debuts
2008 Spanish television series endings
2000s Spanish drama television series
Television shows set in Madrid
Television series set in the 1800s
Telemadrid original programming
Peninsular War in fiction
Television series by BocaBoca